In game theory, a Hicks-optimal outcome, named after John Hicks, is an outcome in which the total payoff for all of the players of a game is the most it could possibly be.  A Hicks-optimal outcome is always Pareto efficient.

See also 

 Kaldor-Hicks efficiency
 Pareto efficiency
 Nash equilibrium

Game theory